Katrina "Katie" Schlukebir (born April 29, 1975) is a former professional tennis player from the United States.

Biography
Schlukebir was born in Kalamazoo, Michigan, to insurance agent John and tennis instructor Kathy. On her father's side she is of German and Dutch descent. She is the eldest of three daughters. Her youngest sister, Kristen, also became a professional tennis player. The middle sister, Karie, played tennis at Indiana University, before her death from cancer in 2010.

A right-handed player, Schlukebir started out in tennis aged four, introduced to the sport by her mother. She was runner-up in the girls' doubles event at the 1992 US Open, with partner Julie Steven. Later she played on the collegiate team at Stanford University and in 1997 was a member of the championship winning side. Individually she was a four-time All-American and in the championship year of 1997 won Stanford's award for both "Sophomore Athlete of the Year" and "Woman of the Year". She graduated in 1997 with a degree in psychology, then joined the professional tour full-time.

On the professional circuit, she specialised as a doubles player and peaked at No. 46 in the world. She made two WTA Tour finals, with her only title coming at the 1999 Challenge Bell in Quebec, partnering Amy Frazier.

Schlukebir was a regular competitor in doubles draws at Grand Slam competitions. She made the women's doubles quarterfinals at the 1998 US Open with Amy Frazier, along the way accounting for sixth seeds Anna Kournikova and Larisa Neiland. In 1999, she played mixed doubles with Mike Bryan at the French Open, Wimbledon and US Open. Her best Grand Slam performance in the mixed doubles was a quarterfinal appearance, partnering Eric Taino at the 2000 Wimbledon Championships, where they were beaten by Lleyton Hewitt and Kim Clijsters.

Following her playing career, she worked as a coach for the USTA.

WTA career finals

Doubles: 2 (1 title, 1 runner-up)

ITF finals

Singles (2–1)

Doubles (12–4)

References

External links
 
 

1975 births
Living people
American female tennis players
Sportspeople from Kalamazoo, Michigan
Tennis people from Michigan
Stanford Cardinal women's tennis players
American people of German descent
American people of Dutch descent